Patrick Ryan may refer to:
Patrick Ryan (American author) (born 1965), American novelist and editor
Patrick Ryan (English author) (1916–1989), English author
Patrick Ryan (hammer thrower) (1881–1964), U.S. Olympic athlete and New York City police officer
Patrick Ryan (Irish politician) (1898–1944), Irish Sinn Féin politician from Tipperary
Patrick Ryan (Irish priest) (born 1930), Irish Catholic priest and alleged IRA supplier
Patrick Ryan (wheelchair rugby) (born 1981), Australian Paralympic wheelchair rugby union player
Patrick Ryan, president of Loyola Jesuit College, 1999–2005
Patrick Ryan, voice actor of Nightmare in Soulcalibur III
Patrick D. Ryan (1920–2004), mayor of Galway from 1962 to 1963
Patrick G. Ryan (1838–1906), leather manufacturer and political figure in New Brunswick
Patrick J. D. Ryan, member of the States of Jersey
Patrick J. Ryan (chaplain) (1902–1975), Chief of Chaplains of the U.S. Army
Patrick J. Ryan (New York judge) (1861–1940), American lawyer, politician, and judge from New York
Patrick John Ryan (1831–1911), Irish-American bishop
Patrick Joseph Ryan (1904–1969), Australian anti-communist priest
Patrick Kevin "Pat" Ryan (born 1982), American politician 
Patrick W. Ryan (died 1993), Irish politician
Paddy Ryan (1851–1900), Irish-American boxer
Pat Ryan (executive) (Patrick G. Ryan), founder and retired executive chairman of Aon Corporation
Patrick Finbar Ryan, Archbishop of Port of Spain

See also
Pat Ryan (disambiguation)